The 318th Fighter Interceptor Squadron is an inactive United States Air Force unit.  Its last assignment was with the 25th Air Division at McChord Air Force Base, Washington, where it was inactivated on 7 December 1989.

The squadron was first activated as the 318th Fighter Squadron during World War II.  After training in the United States, it deployed to North Africa.  In combat operations in the Mediterranean Theater of Operations.  It was withdrawn from combat from September to December 1943 while it equipped with different aircraft and moved from Africa to Italy.  It earned two Distinguished Unit Citations before returning to the United States for inactivation.  

The squadron was reactivated in 1947, serving in the air defense role in the Northeastern United States, initially equipping with World War II era night fighters.  By 1950, it had moved across the continent and began to equip with jet fighters.  In 1953, the squadron moved to provide air defense of Greenland, but it was replaced by another squadron the following year.  With the implementation of Project Arrow in the summer of 1955, the 318th returned to the Pacific Northwest and its traditional headquarters, the 325th Fighter Group.  During the Cuban Missile Crisis, the squadron deployed a third of its aircraft to a nearby airfield.  When the Soviet Long-Range Aviation began flights over Alaska, the squadron deployed aircraft and crews to augment Alaskan Air Command.  In 1968, following the Pueblo Crisis it deployed planes to Korea.

History

World War II
The squadron was first organized at Mitchel Field, New York on 3 August 1942 as one of the three original squadrons of the 325th Fighter Group, but moved the same day to New Bedford Army Air Field, Massachusetts. It equipped with Curtiss P-40 Warhawks and trained for combat at New Bedford and Grenier Field, New Hampshire until late January 1943, when it began to deploy overseas.

The squadron arrived in the Mediterranean Theater of Operations in February and was established at its first combat station, Tafaraoui Airfield, Algeria by 28 February 1943.  It flew its first combat mission on 17 April. It escorted medium bombers.  It flew strafing missions and flew sweeps over the Mediterranean Sea from bases in Algeria and Tunisia.  The squadron participated in the defeat of Axis forces in Tunisia.  It participated in the reduction of Pantelleria and in Operation Husky, the invasion and conquest of Sicily.  On 30 July, the 325th Group used diversionary tactics to lure a superior number of enemy planes into the air over Sardinia, destroying more than half of them.  The squadron was awarded its first Distinguished Unit Citation for this action.  In late September 1943, the squadron was withdrawn from combat to convert to Republic P-47 Thunderbolts and prepare to move to the Italian peninsula.  
  

By early December 1943, the squadron began to operate its Thunderbolts from Foggia Airfield, Italy, flying its first mission with the new plane on 14 December.  However, it only operated the P-47 for a short period, converting to North American P-51 Mustangs in March 1944, and moving to Lesina Airfield, Italy on the 29th of the month.  However, on 30 January it flew its "T-Bolts" more than 300 miles at very low altitude to make a surprise attack on German interceptors defending airdromes near Villorba.  The severe losses it inflicted on the defending forces enabled heavy bombers to attack vital targets in the area without encountering serious opposition.  This action resulted in the second award of the Distinguished Unit Citation to the squadron.

It escorted the heavy bombers of Fifteenth Air Force on long range missions against the Daimler Benz factory in Berlin, the Messerschmitt factory in Regensburg and oil refineries near Vienna.  It also flew escort for attacks on other targets, such as airfields and marshalling yards and lines of communication in Italy, France, Germany, Czechoslovakia, Austria, Hungary, Yugoslavia and Romania. It also protected reconnaissance aircraft and strafed trains, vehicles and airfields.  The squadron continued operations until May 1945.  The 318th was credited with the destruction of 173 enemy aircraft in air to air combat.  After V-E Day, it  moved to Vincenzo Airfield, Italy, remaining there until October, when it returned to the United States and was inactivated at Camp Kilmer, New Jersey on 28 October.

Air Defense Command

Early operations

The squadron was reactivated in May 1947 at Mitchell Field, New York as an element of Air Defense Command (ADC). In December 1947 it moved to Hamilton Field, California where it received its first aircraft, Northrop P-61 Black Widows which had been pressed into the air defense mission.  In the spring of 1948 the squadron received new North American F-82 Twin Mustangs and in November 1948, it moved to McChord Air Force Base, Washington.  There, it was redesignated the 318th Fighter All Weather Squadron in January 1950 and the 318th Fighter-Interceptor Squadron' in May 1951.  In June 1951 the squadron began its transition into jet Lockheed F-94A Starfire interceptors armed with 20 millimeter cannon, completing the upgrade by the end of the year.

In June 1953, the squadron moved to Thule Air Base, Greenland, where it came under the control of the Northeast Air Command.  The squadron returned to ADC in August 1954 when it was replaced by the 74th Fighter-Interceptor Squadron, which moved  from Presque Isle Air Force Base, Maine and took over the 318th's Starfighters.  In turn, the 318th moved to Presque Isle and equipped with the 74th's former Northrop F-89D Scorpions, armed with FFAR rockets.  In August 1955 ADC implemented Project Arrow, which was designed to bring back on the active list the fighter units which had compiled memorable records in the two world wars.  As  part of this project, the squadron returned to McChord and once again became part of the 325th Fighter Group, to which it had been assigned during World War II.  At McChord, it took over the personnel and North American F-86D Sabres formerly assigned to the 465th Fighter-Interceptor Squadron, which was inactivated.

F-106 era

In March 1957, the squadron began a transition into supersonic Convair F-102A Delta Daggers, armed with GAR-1 Falcons and equipped with data link for interception control through the Semi-Automatic Ground Environment system. In March 1960, the 325th Fighter Group was inactivated and the squadron was assigned directly to the 325th Fighter Wing   The following month it upgraded to Convair F-106 Delta Darts.

On 22 October 1962, before President John F. Kennedy told Americans that missiles were in place in Cuba, the squadron dispersed one third of its force, equipped with nuclear tipped missiles to Paine Air Force Base at the start of the Cuban Missile Crisis. These planes returned to McChord after the crisis was over.

On 15 March 1963, two Soviet bombers overflew Alaska and Alaskan Air Command F-102s were unable to intercept them. The response to this intrusion was to deploy ten F-106s from the squadron and its sister unit, the 498th Fighter-Interceptor Squadron to Alaska in what was called Operation White Shoes. However, maintaining these aircraft for an extended period of time put a strain on the 325th Wing's combat readiness back at McChord, and eventually a detachment of maintenance personnel was established to maintain the planes in Alaska.  The unit got relief from this commitment while it was upgrading its F-106s from the 1st Fighter-Interceptor Wing, which relieved it from March to June 1964.  Operation White Shoes terminated in 1965 and the unit's planes returned home.

On 11 February 1968, the 318th deployed to Osan Air Base, Republic of Korea from McChord to provide air defense following the 26 January 1968 North Korea seizure of the USS Pueblo in Operation Red Fox. This marked the first time in history that F-106s had flown across the Pacific using in-flight refueling.  In June 1968, the squadron was relieved by the 48th Fighter-Interceptor Squadron, but its aircraft remained in Korea.  As its personnel returned to the United States, they re-equipped with F-106s from the 48th.  The 325th Wing inactivated on 1 July 1968 as Military Airlift Command assumed responsibility for McChord, and the squadron was reassigned directly to the 25th Air Division. 

In 1970 and in 1984, the squadron won the Hughes Trophy as the best interceptor squadron in the Air Force.  On 24 November 1971, D. B. Cooper hijacked a Northwest Orient Airlines flight, demanding ransom and threatening the passengers.  Two F-106s from the squadron scrambled to trail the hijacked airliner.

Final operations at McChord
The 318th converted to McDonnell F-15 Eagles in 1983.  During its time flying the F-106, the squadron had maintained alert detachments at various times at Kingsley Field, Oregon; Walla Walla Regional Airport, Washington; and at Castle Air Force Base, California.  The detachment at Castle was active when the squadron converted to Eagles, but it continued to operate the Delta Dart.  Although administratively part of the 318th, it drew its pilots and technicians from the 194th Fighter-Interceptor Squadron of the California Air National Guard.  The squadron remained at McChord until inactivating on 7 December 1989.

Lineage
 Constituted as the 318th Fighter Squadron on 24 June 1942
 Activated on 3 August 1942
 Inactivated on 28 October 1945
 Activated on 21 May 1947
 Redesignated 318th Fighter Squadron (All Weather) on 10 May 1948
 Redesignated 318th Fighter-All Weather Squadron on 20 January 1950
 Redesignated 318th Fighter-Interceptor Squadron on 1 May 1951
 Inactivated 7 December 1989

Assignments

 325th Fighter Group, 3 August 1942 – 28 October 1945
 325th Fighter Group (later 325th Fighter-All Weather Group, 325th Fighter-Interceptor Group), 21 May 1947
 4704th Defense Wing, 6 February 1952
 567th Air Defense Group, 16 February 1953

 64th Air Division, 1 July 1953
 528th Air Defense Group, 8 August 1954
 325th Fighter Group (Air Defense), 18 August 1955
 325th Fighter Wing (Air Defense), 25 March 1960 – 1 July 1968
 25th Air Division, 1 July 1968
 Northwest Air Defense Sector, 1 December 1987 – 7 December 1989

Stations

 Mitchel Field, New York, 3 August 1942
 New Bedford Army Air Field, Massachusetts, 3 August 1942
 Grenier Field, New Hampshire, 3 October 1942 – 22 January 1943
 Tafaraoui Airfield, Algeria, 28 February 1943
 Montesquieu Airfield, Algeria, 7 April 1943
 Souk-el-Khemis Airfield, Tunisia, 3 June 1943
 Mateur Airfield, Tunisia, 19 June 1943
 Soliman Airfield, Tunisia, 4 November 1943
 Foggia Airfield, Italy, 9 December 1943
 Lesina Airfield, Italy, 29 March 1944

 Rimini, Italy, c. 7 March 1945
 Mondolfo, Italy, c. 3 April 1945
 Vincenzo Airfield, Italy, 9 July – October 1945
 Camp Kilmer, New Jersey, 26–28 October 1945
 Mitchel Field, New York, 21 May 1947
 Hamilton Field (later Hamilton Air Force Base), California, 2 December 1947
 McChord Air Force Base, Washington, 26 November 1948
 Thule Air Base, Greenland, 1 July 1953
 Presque Isle Air Force Base, Maine, 5 August 1954
 McChord Air Force Base, Washington, 18 August 1955 – 7 December 1989

Aircraft

 Curtiss P-40 Warhawk, 1942–1943
 Republic P-47 Thunderbolt, 1943–1944
 North American P-51 Mustang, 1944–1945
 Northrop P-61 Black Widow, 1947–1948
 North American F-82 Twin Mustang, 1948–1951
 Lockheed F-94A Starfire, 1951–1954
 Northrop F-89D Scorpion, 1954–1955
 North American F-86D Sabre, 1955–1957
 Convair F-102 Delta Dagger, 1957–1960
 Lockheed T-33 Shooting Star, 1951–1988 (used as a proficiency trainer and practice "bogey" aircraft)
 Northrop F-106 Delta Dart, 1960–1983
 McDonnell F-15 Eagle, 1983–1989

Awards and campaigns

See also

References

Notes
 Explanatory notes

 Citations

Bibliography

 Buss, Lydus H.(ed), Sturm, Thomas A., Volan, Denys, and McMullen, Richard F., History of Continental Air Defense Command and Air Defense Command July to December 1955, Directorate of Historical Services, Air Defense Command, Ent AFB, CO, (1956)
 
 
 
 McMullen, Richard F. (1964) "The Fighter Interceptor Force 1962–1964"  ADC Historical Study No. 27, Air Defense Command, Ent Air Force Base, CO (Confidential, declassified 22 March 2000)
 
 
 
 NORAD/CONAD Participation in the Cuban Missile Crisis, Historical Reference Paper No. 8, Directorate of Command History Continental Air Defense Command, Ent AFB, CO, 1 Feb 63 (Top Secret NOFORN declassified 9 March 1996)
  
 

 Further reading
 
 

Fighter squadrons of the United States Air Force